Bhakha, also known as Bhakha (Gir) and Gir Bhakha, is a village / panchayat located in the Gir Gadhada Taluka of Gir Somnath district in Gujarat State, India. Earlier, until August 2013, Bhakha was part of Una Taluka and Junagadh district. The latitude 20.820009 and longitude 71.044327 are the geo-coordinate of the Village Thordi. Gandhinagar is the state capital of Thordi village which is located around 400 kilometres away from Thordi.

According to Census 2011, with the 227 families, the population of this village is 1215. Out of this, 606 are males and 609 are females. Most residents are dependent on agriculture.

Demographics 
According to the 2011 census of India, Bhakha has 227 households. The effective literacy rate (i.e. the literacy rate of population excluding children aged 6 and below) is 73.26%.

References 

Villages in Gir Gadhada Taluka
Villages in Gir Somnath district